Concord Community Schools is a public school district located in Concord, Michigan.

Schools
Concord High School 
Concord Middle School
Concord Elementary School

Notable alumni
Bob Beemer, Detroit Lions defensive end in the NFL

References

External links
Concord Community Schools website

Education in Jackson County, Michigan
School districts in Michigan